The Chinese Ambassador to Jamaica is the official representative of the People's Republic of China to Jamaica.

List of representatives

See also
China–Jamaica relations

References 

Ambassadors of China to Jamaica
Jamaica
China